The 1999 NCAA Division I Women's Lacrosse Championship was the 18th annual single-elimination tournament to determine the national champion of Division I NCAA women's college lacrosse. The championship game was played at Homewood Field in Baltimore, Maryland during May 1999. All NCAA Division I women's lacrosse programs were eligible for this championship. Ultimately, 12 teams were invited to the tournament.

Maryland defeated Virginia, 16–6, to win their seventh and fifth consecutive, national championship. This was a rematch of the previous year's final, also won by the Terrapins. This would subsequently become the fifth of Maryland's record seven straight national titles (1995–2001). Furthermore, Maryland's win secured an undefeated season (21–0) for the team.

The leading scorer for the tournament, with 16 goals, was Jen Adams from Maryland. Adams was also named the tournament's Most Outstanding Player.

Teams

Tournament bracket

Tournament outstanding players 
Sandy Johnston, Duke
Kate Kaiser, Duke
Jen Adams, Maryland (Most outstanding player)
Allison Comito, Maryland
Christie Jenkins, Maryland
Alex Kahoe, Maryland
Kristin Sommar, Maryland
Colleen O'Brien, Penn State
Jen Webb, Penn State
Kelly Allenbach, Virginia
Melissa Hayes, Virginia
Gina Sambus, Virginia

See also 
 NCAA Division I Women's Lacrosse Championship
 NCAA Division III Women's Lacrosse Championship
 1999 NCAA Division I Men's Lacrosse Championship

References

NCAA Division I Women's Lacrosse Championship
NCAA Division I Women's Lacrosse Championship
NCAA Women's Lacrosse Championship